Maximilian Andreas Friedrich Gustav Ernst August Bernhard Prinz und Markgraf von Baden, Herzog von Zähringen (3 July 1933 – 29 December 2022), styled Margrave of Baden, also known as Max von Baden, was a German businessman and the head of House of Baden. Through his mother, Princess Theodora of Greece and Denmark, the second sister of Prince Philip, Duke of Edinburgh, he was a first cousin of King Charles III of the United Kingdom.

Early life and family
Maximilian was born on 3 July 1933 in Salem. He was the second child and eldest son of Berthold, Margrave of Baden, and his wife, Princess Theodora of Greece and Denmark. He had one older sister, Princess Margarita, and has a younger brother, Prince Ludwig (born 1937).

Marriage and children
Maximilian was briefly engaged to his first cousin, Princess Beatrix of Hohenlohe-Langenburg, daughter of his maternal aunt, Margarita, Princess of Hohenlohe-Langenburg. This was broken off. In 1963 he followed his father as head of the former grand ducal house of Baden, styled HRH The Margrave of Baden, Duke of Zähringen. In 1966, he married Archduchess Valerie of Austria (born 1941), daughter of Archduke Hubert Salvator of Austria and Princess Rosemary of Salm-Salm. They were married civilly on 23 September 1966 at Salem and religiously on 30 September 1966 at Persenbeug Castle in Lower Austria.

The Margrave and Margravine had four children: 
 Princess Marie Louise Elisabeth Mathilde Theodora Cecilie Sarah Charlotte of Baden (born Salem, 3 July 1969); she married, civilly, at Salem on 15 September 1999 and religiously on 25 September 1999, Richard Dudley Baker, they have one daughter.
 Bernhard Max Friedrich August Gustav Louis Kraft, Margrave of Baden (born Salem, 27 May 1970)
 Prince Leopold Max Christian Ludwig Clemens Hubert of Baden (born Salem, 1 October 1971), unmarried and without issue.
 Prince Michael Max Andreas of Baden (born Salem, 11 March 1976); he married at Salem on 4 July 2015 Christina Höhne, without issue.

The Margravine represented the Margrave for the state funeral of Queen Elizabeth II, his aunt, at Westminster Abbey in London on 19 September 2022, with Prince Bernhard and his wife, Stephanie.

Death
Maximilian died in Salem Castle on 29 December 2022, at the age of 89. He was succeeded as titular margrave and head of house by his son Bernhard.

The Margrave's funeral service on 13 January 2023 in the church of Salem Abbey was attended by numerous representatives from politics, including the minister president of Baden-Württemberg, Winfried Kretschmann, and aristocracy, such as King Philippe of Belgium, Prince Albert II of Monaco and his sister Caroline, Princess of Hanover, Prince Hassan of Jordan and the Hereditary Princess of Liechtenstein as well as the heads or representatives of most of the former ruling houses of Germany. His first cousin King Charles III was represented by Donatus, Landgrave of Hesse.

Ancestry

Notes

References

External links

1933 births
2022 deaths
People from Bodenseekreis
House of Zähringen
German princes
Margraves of Baden